A hockey puck is either an open or closed disk used in a variety of sports and games. There are designs made for use on an ice surface, such as in ice hockey, and others for the different variants of floor hockey which includes the wheeled skate variant of inline hockey ( roller hockey). They are all designed to serve the same function a ball does in ball games.

A closed disk hockey puck having the shape of a short cylinder made of vulcanized rubber is used in the sport of ice hockey. The closed disk has also been referred to as a "flat ball." Hockey pucks are designed for use on either an ice surface, dry floor, or underwater, though open disk designs have only been used on floors.

Open disk hockey pucks have a hole, forming the shape of a toroid, for use in a particular style of floor hockey. They should not be confused with ringette rings, which are toruses, for use in the sport of ringette. 
This article deals chiefly with the sport and game pucks which are closed disks.

Etymology

The origin of the word puck is obscure. The Oxford English Dictionary suggests the name is related to the verb to puck (a cognate of poke) used in the games of shinty and hurling for striking or pushing the ball, from the Scottish Gaelic puc or the Irish poc, meaning "to poke, punch or deliver a blow":

It is possible that settlers of Nova Scotia, many of whom were Scottish and Irish who played shinty and hurling, may have introduced the word to Canada. This is supported by the prevalent use in Canada of the word "shinny" for an informal or "pick-up" game of hockey, which is also derived from the Scottish game of shinty. The first known printed reference was in Montreal, in 1876 (Montreal Gazette of February 7, 1876), just a year after the first indoor game was played there.

A hockey puck is also referred to colloquially as a "biscuit". To put the "biscuit in the basket" (colloquial for the goal) is to score a goal.

In ice hockey
Ice hockey requires a hard disk of vulcanized rubber. Pucks are often marked with silkscreened team or league logos on one or both faces. Pucks are frozen before the game to reduce bouncing during play.

History

The first hockey pucks
The first hockey pucks were made from frozen cow dung and leather liver pads. These early pucks had a lifespan of about one game before they were too soft or too hard for playability, so they were replaced with wooden ones.

Square Puck

Square Pucks, made of wood or rubber, were used in hockey's earliest games. The original puck used first in the first organized games in Kingston on March 10, 1886 (on display at the Original Hockey Hall of Fame), was made from a cut down lacrosse ball. It looks like a lump of coal, is made from soft rubber, and bounces far more than a modern hockey puck.

Ball games on ice
The sport of bandy, prior to its first official organization in Britain, had its informal variants spread to North America where they and game concepts from lacrosse, shinty and hurling served as precursors in some format to ice hockey. These informal games utilized various types of balls while being played on ice until the latter half of 19th century Canada, after which the game of ice hockey and the ice hockey puck began to take their official shape and form.

Shape and material
By the 1870s, flat pucks were made of wood as well as rubber. At first, pucks were made in the shape of a square. Records from the first indoor ice hockey game used a wooden puck, to prevent it from leaving the area of play though new evidence has shown that cuts from large corks have also been used.
 
Rubber pucks were first made by slicing a rubber ball, then trimming the disk square. The Victoria Hockey Club of Montreal is credited with making and using the first round pucks, in the 1880s.

Variations
There are several variations on the standard black,  hockey puck. One of the most common is a blue,  puck that is used for training younger players who are not yet able to use a standard puck. Heavier  training pucks, typically reddish pink or reddish orange in colour, are also available for players looking to develop the strength of their shots or improve their stick handling skills. Players looking to increase wrist strength often practice with steel pucks that weigh ; these pucks are not used for shooting, as they could seriously harm other players. White pucks are used for goaltender practice. These are regulation size and weight, but made from white rubber. A hollow, light-weight fluorescent orange puck is available for road or floor hockey. Other variants, some with plastic ball-bearings or glides, are available for use for road or roller hockey.

Two major developments have been devised to create better puck visibility on television broadcasts, but both were short-lived:

Firepuck
The use of a "Firepuck" in the early 1990s was the first attempt to improve the visibility of hockey pucks as seen on television. This invention incorporated coloured retro reflective materials of either embedded lens elements or prismatic reflectors laminated into recesses on the flat surfaces and the vertical edge of a standard hockey puck. Yellow was the preferred reflected colour. A spotlight was required to be positioned on the TV camera and focused at the centre of the viewing area.

A short demonstration tape of the Minnesota North Stars skating with the Firepuck was shown during the period break at the 1993 NHL All-Star Game in Montreal. The International Hockey League (IHL) pursued testing the Firepuck with its inventor, Donald Klassen. The next television viewing was the IHL All-Star Game in Fort Wayne, Indiana, January 1994, where the Firepuck was used for the entire game. The IHL tested the Firepuck in two more games, and finally the East Coast Hockey League used it January 17, 1997, for their all-star game.

The use of the Firepuck was discontinued because of these reasons:
 The slight structural change increased the tendency for the puck to bounce on the ice. This made it more difficult for the goaltender and resulted in increased scoring.
 The skaters objected to the use of camera spotlights which reflected off the ice.
 The television viewing contrast of the Firepuck was not noticeably enhanced when the camera view was of the entire rink, this being the most common camera shot.

The Firepuck name was branded during the 1990s but has since been discontinued.

Smart puck

The FoxTrax "smart puck" was developed by the Fox television network when it held National Hockey League (NHL) broadcasting rights for the United States. The puck had integrated electronics to track its position on screen; a blue streak traced the path of the puck across the ice. The streak would turn red if the puck was shot especially hard. This was an experiment in broadcasting intended to help viewers unfamiliar with hockey to better follow the game by making the puck more visible. It was ill-received by many traditional hockey fans, but appreciated by many of the more casual viewers. The system debuted with much publicity in the NHL All-Star game at the Boston Fleet Center on January 20, 1996, but the system was shelved when Fox Sports lost the NHL broadcast rights three years later.

In game play
Zdeno Chára, whose slapshot clocked  in the 2013 NHL All-Star Game SuperSkills competition, broke his own earlier record.

Fast-flying pucks are potentially dangerous to players and spectators. Puck-related injuries at hockey games are not uncommon. This led to the evolution of various types of protective gear for players, most notably the goaltender mask. The most notable incident involving a spectator took place on March 18, 2002, when a 13-year-old girl, Brittanie Cecil, died two days after being struck on the head by a hockey puck deflected into the crowd at a NHL game between the Calgary Flames and Columbus Blue Jackets in Columbus. This is the only known incident of this type to have occurred in the history of the league. Partly as a result of this event, the glass or plexiglass panels that sit atop the boards of hockey rinks to protect spectators have been supplemented with mesh nets that extend above the upper edge of the glass.

Manufacture
NHL regulation pucks were not required for professional play until the 1990–91 season, but were standardized for consistent play and ease of manufacture half a century earlier, by Art Ross, in 1940. Major manufacturers of pucks exist in Canada, Russia, the Czech Republic, the People's Republic of China, and Slovakia.

The black rubber of the puck is made up of a mix of natural rubber, antioxidants, bonding materials and other chemicals to achieve a balance of hardness and resilience. This mixture is then turned in a machine with metal rollers, where workers add extra natural rubber, and ensure that the mixing is even. Samples are then put into a machine that analyses if the rubber will harden at the right temperature. These pre-forms are then manually put into moulds that are the exact size of a finished puck. There are up to 200 mould cavities per moulding palette, capable of producing up to 5,000 pucks per week. The moulds are then compressed. They come out hard and then are allowed to sit for 24 hours. Each puck is manually cleaned with a trimmer machine to remove excess rubber. The moulding process adds a diamond cross-hatch texture around the edge of the puck for more friction between the stick and puck for better control and puck handling.

This allows approximately twice as many pucks to be manufactured in the same time period as the more exacting production of NHL regulation pucks. People sometimes freeze pucks to prevent them from sticking to the ice.

The list of former or present-day major producers includes
  Viceroy
  Sher-Wood - Olympics 2010.
  Pro-Flex
  Gufex - Olympics 1998, 2002, 2006 and 2018. Since 1999, all World Championships.
  Rubena - Olympics 2014.
  Vegum Dolné Vestenice
  Converse
  HockeyShot
  Spalding
  Xiamen Yin Hua Silicone Rubber Products Co., Ltd.
  Xiamen Deng Hong Silica Gel Product Co., Ltd.
  Xiamen Ijetech Industry & Trade Co. Ltd

In roller hockey

Roller hockey pucks,  in-line hockey pucks, are similar to ice-hockey pucks but are made from plastic and thus lighter. They have small ribs protruding from their tops and bottoms which limit contact with the surface, allowing better sliding motion and less friction. These pucks are mostly commonly red in color but can be found in almost any color, though light, visible colours such as red, orange, yellow, pink, and green, are typical. Roller hockey pucks were created so inline hockey and street hockey players could play with a puck instead of a ball on surfaces such as hardwood, concrete, and asphalt.

In underwater hockey

Originally known as "squid" in the United Kingdom and now more commonly known as "Octopush", underwater hockey uses a type of puck that while similar in appearance to an ice hockey puck, differs in that it has a lead core weighing approximately  within a teflon, plastic or rubber coating. This makes the puck dense enough to sink in a swimming pool, though it can be lofted during passes, while affording some protection to the pool tiles.

A smaller and lighter version of the standard puck exists for junior competition and is approximately 1 lb 12 oz (0.80–0.85 kg) and of similar construction to the standard puck.

While there are numerous regional variations in colour, construction and materials all must conform to international regulations stipulating overall dimensions and weight. The regulations state that pucks should be a bright distinctive colour, for example high-visibility pink or orange, and that for World Championships these are the only acceptable colours.

In Spongee

Spongee  "sponge hockey", is an organized recreational cult game that emerged in Canada around the 1950s and is played in the Canadian city of Winnipeg. It gets its name from the puck that is used: instead of the hard vulcanized rubber puck used in regular ice hockey, a softer sponge puck is used.<ref name="spongeepuck"  At on point some locals referred to it as "Tweeter" based on the sound the original pucks made. The game is a variant of ice hockey and was influenced by Canadian road hockey players and ice hockey players playing shinny on outdoor rinks in running shoes and winter boots. The game is played in winter strictly on outdoor rinks (no matter how cold), does not use ice skates, and has codes involving less contact. Broomball shoes are sometimes used.

The spongee puck originated when someone took a toy red, white and blue handball and cut out the center, leaving a rude approximation of a standard hockey puck. Eventually manufactured types of sponge pucks came into use, some of which were developed in Slovakia and had a spring core. Spongee pucks are softer than ice hockey pucks and have more bounce.

In other sports and games
The term "puck" is sometimes also applied to similar (though often smaller) gaming discs in other sports and games, including novuss, shuffleboard, table shuffleboard, box hockey, floor hockey, and air hockey.

Alternative uses
Ice hockey pucks of regulation  diameter and  thickness may be used as mechanical vibration dampening isolators in places such as feet for light industrial air compressors, and air conditioning units because they are of regulation materials and therefore consistent manufacture, size and shape, and are constructed of a repeatable and consistent vulcanized rubber material.  

Since the material is rubber, it may be drilled out or milled easily to a fixed depth as rubber feet or used as rubber spacer or gasket material.  

A very common use of a slotted hockey puck is as an adaptor between the metal foot of a trolley jack and the sill (rocker panel) of an automobile.  The sill has a spot-welded lip which fits into the slot of the puck and would otherwise be bent or marked by the metal foot.  

In November 2018, faculty of Oakland University in Michigan received hockey pucks and training to throw them as a possible last-ditch defense against active shooters.  The American Association of University Professors distributed pucks to its 800 members, and is working with student groups to distribute an additional 1,700 pucks to students.

See also
 Ice hockey equipment
 Sports equipment

References

Sports equipment
Puck
Puck